Woolson is a surname. Notable people with the surname include:

Abba Goold Woolson (1838–1921), American writer
Albert Woolson (1850–1956), the last surviving member of the Union Army, which fought in the American Civil War
Constance Fenimore Woolson (1840–1894), American novelist and short story writer
John Simson Woolson (1840–1899), United States federal judge
Woolson Morse (1858–1897), American composer of musical theatre